Mondelli is a surname. Notable people with the surname include:

Filippo Mondelli (1994–2021), Italian rower
Luigi Mondelli (born 1972), Brazilian-American Brazilian jiu-jitsu practitioner